40th New York Film Critics Circle Awards
January 26, 1975
(announced January 8, 1975)

Best Picture:
 Amarcord 
The 40th New York Film Critics Circle Awards, 26 January 1975, honored the best filmmaking of 1974.

Winners
Best Actor: 
Jack Nicholson — Chinatown and The Last Detail
Runners-up: Gene Hackman — The Conversation and Richard Dreyfuss — The Apprenticeship of Duddy Kravitz
Best Actress: 
Liv Ullmann — Scenes from a Marriage (Scener ur ett äktenskap)
Runner-up: Gena Rowlands — A Woman Under the Influence
Best Director: 
Federico Fellini — Amarcord
Runner-up: Ingmar Bergman — Scenes from a Marriage (Scener ur ett äktenskap)
Best Film: 
Amarcord
Runners-up: Scenes from a Marriage (Scener ur ett äktenskap) and The Godfather Part II
Best Screenplay: 
Ingmar Bergman — Scenes from a Marriage (Scener ur ett äktenskap)
Runners-up: Robert Towne — Chinatown and Francis Ford Coppola — The Conversation
Best Supporting Actor: 
Charles Boyer — Stavisky
Runners-up: Robert De Niro — The Godfather Part II and Lee Strasberg — The Godfather Part II
Best Supporting Actress:
Valerie Perrine — Lenny
Runners-up: Bibi Andersson — Scenes from a Marriage (Scener ur ett äktenskap) and Madeline Kahn — Young Frankenstein
Special Award:
Fabiano Canosa

References

External links
1974 Awards

1974
New York Film Critics Circle Awards, 1974
New York Film Critics Circle Awards
New York Film Critics Circle Awards
New York Film Critics Circle Awards
New York Film Critics Circle Awards